Geshn is a village in Bayg Rural District, Bayg District, Torbat-e Heydarieh County, Razavi Khorasan Province, Iran. At the 2006 census, its population was 88, in 31 families.

References 

Populated places in Torbat-e Heydarieh County